

A 
 Alauda József
 Albert Ferenc
 Almár Iván
 Andrássy István

B 
 Balajthi Máté
 Balázs Lajos
 Berkó Ernő
 Bogdán Ákos Max Planck Asztrofizikai Intézet
 Borkovits Tamás
 Both Előd
 Bruna Xaver Ferenc

D 
 Detre László
 Dezső Lóránt

F 
 Fejes István
 Fényi Gyula
 Frey Sándor
 David Friesenhausen

G 
 Gothard Jenő
 Guman István

H 
 Harkányi Béla
 Hédervári Péter
 Hegedüs Tibor
 Hell Miksa
 Hollósy Jusztinián
 Horváth András
 Horváth István

I 
 Ill Márton
 Izsák Imre

J 
 Lajos Jánossy

K 
 Kiss László
 Kolláth Zoltán
 Kondor Gusztáv
 Konkoly-Thege Miklós
 Kövesligethy Radó
 Kulin György

L 
 Löw Móritz

M 
 Mahler Ede
 Marik Miklós

N 
 Nagy Károly
 Nagy Sándor

P 
 Paál György
 Ponori Thewrewk Aurél

R 
 Rezsabek Nándor

S 
 Sajnovics János
 Szabados László
 Szatmáry Károly
 Szentmártoni Béla
 Sárneczky Krisztián
 Szebehely Győző

T 
 Teres Ágoston
 Terkán Lajos
 Tittel Pál

V 
 Virághalmy Géza

W 
 Weinek László

Z 
 Zách János Ferenc
 Zerinváry Szilárd

 
Lists of astronomers by nationality